Cyme is a genus of moths in the family Erebidae. The genus was described by Felder in 1861.

Species
Cyme anaemica (Hampson, 1911)
Cyme analogus (Rothschild, 1913)
Cyme aroa (Bethune-Baker, 1904)
Cyme asuroides (Rothschild, 1913)
Cyme avernalis (Butler, 1887)
Cyme basitesselata (Rothschild, 1913)
Cyme biagi (Bethune-Baker, 1908)
Cyme celebensis (Roepke, 1946)
Cyme citrinopuncta (Rothschild, 1913)
Cyme coccineotermen (Rothschild, 1913)
Cyme crocota (Hampson, 1900)
Cyme effasciata (Felder, 1861)
Cyme euprepioides (Walker, 1862)
Cyme feminina (Rothschild, 1913)
Cyme haemachroa (Hampson, 1905)
Cyme insularis (Rothschild, 1913)
Cyme metascota (Hampson, 1905)
Cyme laeta Looijenga, 2021
Cyme miltochristaemorpha (Rothschild, 1913)
Cyme miltochristina (Rothschild, 1913)
Cyme multidentata (Hampson, 1900)
Cyme phryctopa (Meyrick, 1889)
Cyme pyraula (Meyrick, 1886)
Cyme pyrostrota (Hampson, 1914)
Cyme pyrrhauloides (Rothschild, 1913)
Cyme quadrilineata (Pagenstecher, 1886)
Cyme quadrifasciata (Rothschild, 1913)
Cyme reticulata Felder, 1861
Cyme septemmaculata (Heylaerts, 1891)
Cyme serratilinea (Turner, 1940)
Cyme sexualis (Felder, 1864)
Cyme structa (Walker, 1854)
Cyme suavis (Pagenstecher, 1886)
Cyme triangularis (Rothschild, 1916)
Cyme vepallida (Holland, 1900)
Cyme vivida (Walker, 1865)
Cyme wandammenensae (Joicey & Talbot, 1916)
Cyme xantherythra (Hampson, 1900)

References

External links

Nudariina
Moth genera